Lárusson may refer to:

Bjarni Lárusson (born 1976), Icelandic former professional footballer
Daði Lárusson (born 1973), Icelandic former footballer
Georg Kr. Lárusson (born 1959), former director of the Icelandic Directorate of Immigration
Guðmundur Lárusson (1925–2010), Icelandic sprinter
Magnús Már Lárusson (1917–2006), Icelandic theologian and historian
Sigurður Egill Lárusson (born 1992), Icelandic football midfielder
Þórður Lárusson (born 1954), Icelandic former football manager

See also
Larrison
Larsen (disambiguation)
Larson (disambiguation)
Larssen
Larsson

Icelandic-language surnames